Krupin  (also Markowice) is a village in the administrative district of Gmina Wieliczki, within Olecko County, Warmian-Masurian Voivodeship, in north-eastern Poland. It is located in the historic region of Masuria.

History
The origins of the village date back to 1561, when brothers Paweł and Stańko Markowicz from nearby Niedźwiedzkie bought land to establish a village. Initially it was named Markowice after the founders. For centuries, it remained an ethnically Polish village, and as of 1600, it had an exclusively Polish population.

References

Krupin
1561 establishments in Poland
Populated places established in 1561